Malaysia competed at the 1992 Summer Paralympics in Barcelona, Spain. 10 competitors from Malaysia won 3 medals, 1 silver and 2 bronze, finishing joint 51st in the medal table along with Jamaica.

See also 
 Malaysia at the Paralympics
 Malaysia at the 1992 Summer Olympics

References 

1992
1992 in Malaysian sport
Nations at the 1992 Summer Paralympics